Cairncross may refer to:

Places

Australia
 Mary Cairncross Reserve, Queensland
 Cairncross Dockyard, Brisbane, Queensland
 Cairncross Island

Scotland
 Cairncross, Angus - Angus 56.90N 02.83W NO4979

Other uses
 Cairncross (surname), including a list of people with the name